Love in Slow Motion is a 1996 album recorded by the R&B vocalist Angela Bofill.

It was her first studio recording since I Wanna Love Somebody and the tenth released studio album before her stroke on January 10, 2006.

Track listing
All tracks composed by Angela Bofill and Rex Rideout; except where noted.
"All She Wants (Is Love)" - 4:34
"Love in Slow Motion" (Bofill, Rideout, Narada Michael Walden) - 5:48
"Real Love" - 4:44
"Galaxy of My Love" - 5:24
"Guess You Didn't Know" - 4:32
"Sail Away" - 4:53
"Are You Leaving Me Now?" (Bofill, Jon Rosen, Karen Manno) - 4:46
"Let Them Talk" (Bofill, Cynthia Biggs) - 5:11
"Soul of Mine" - 4:42
"Love Changes" (Bofill, Frederico González Peña) - 5:23
"Black Angel" (Bofill) - 4:20

Personnel
Angela Bofill - vocals, co-producer
Andy Korn - producer

Angela Bofill albums
1996 albums